Bashsiz (also Romanized as Bāshsīz; also known as Bāshsīz Kūh) is a village in Ujan-e Gharbi Rural District, in the Central District of Bostanabad County, East Azerbaijan Province, Iran. At the 2006 census, its population was 545, in 92 families.

References 

Populated places in Bostanabad County